Lactarius adhaerens is a member of the large milk-cap genus Lactarius in the order Russulales. It is found in Madagascar, where it grows on decayed wood. The species was first described in 1938 by French botanist Roger Heim.

See also 
 List of Lactarius species

References

External links 
 

adhaerens
Fungi described in 1938
Fungi of Madagascar